The 2003–04 Turkish Ice Hockey Super League season was the 12th season of the Turkish Ice Hockey Super League, the top level of ice hockey in Turkey. Four teams participated in the league playoffs.

Playoffs

3rd place 
 Büyükşehir Belediyesi Ankara Spor Kulübü - İstanbul Paten Spor Kulübü 5:0 (Forfeit)

Final 
 Polis Akademisi ve Koleji - İzmit Büyüksehir BSK 8:2

External links
 Season on hockeyarchives.info

TBHSL
Turkish Ice Hockey Super League seasons
TBSHL